Heliothis cystiphora is a species of moth of the family Noctuidae. It is found in Central America, South America and the Galapagos.

Heliothis
Moths described in 1860